Kasba may refer to:

 Kasbah, a type of citadel or walled town
 Kasba Ganapati, the main Ganesh temple in Pune
 Kasba, Kolkata, a neighbourhood in Kolkata, India
 Kasba (Purnia), a town in Purnia district, Bihar, India
 Kasba, Uttar Dinajpur, a town in North Dinajpur, West Bengal, India
 Kasba Upazila in Brahmanbaria, Chittagong, Bangladesh
 Bara Kasba, a village in Barisal District, Bangladesh
 Chhota Kasba, a village in Barisal District, Bangladesh
 Kasba, Kolkata (Vidhan Sabha constituency)
 Kasba, Purnia (Vidhan Sabha constituency)
 Kasba, Bardhaman, a village in Bardhaman District, West Bengal, India
 Kasba (film), a 1991 Indian film
 Kasba Peth, a locality or area in most of the cities in Maharashtra, India
 Kasbagoas, a village in Murshidabad district, West Bengal, India